Rung may refer to:
 Rung (band), a Pakistan band
 Rung (album), an album by Hadiqa Kiyani
 Rung languages, a proposed group of Tibeto-Burman languages
 Rung, an ethnic group of people inhabiting the Pithoragarh district of Uttarakhand, India and Darchula district, Nepal
 Rung (tele-serial), a Kokborok drama tele-serial
 Rung, a step of a ladder
 Rung, a card game in Pakistan
 Henrik Rung (1807–1871), a Danish composer
 Rung (biology) – a connection between two helices in a nucleic acid double helix